Francesco Laudadio (2 January 1950 – 6 April 2005) was an Italian director, screenwriter and producer.

Life and career 
Born in Mola di Bari, graduated in philosophy, Laudadio started his career as a script supervisor and an assistant director, often working with Mario Monicelli. His debut film Grog won him the David di Donatello for Best New Director.

Filmography 
     Grog (1982) 
     Fatto su misura (1985)
     Topo Galileo (1987)
     The Raffle (1991)
     Persone perbene (1992)
     Esercizi di stile (1996, segment "Un addio nel west")
     L'ultimo concerto (TV, 1996)
     Il mastino (TV, 1997)
     Inviati speciali (TV, 2001)
     Signora (2004)

References

External links 
 

1950 births
2005 deaths
Italian film directors
20th-century Italian screenwriters
Italian male screenwriters
Italian film producers
People from the Province of Bari
David di Donatello winners
20th-century Italian male writers